Baisha is a town of Wanyuan, Sichuan, China. , it has two residential communities and 10 villages under its administration.

See also 
 List of township-level divisions of Sichuan

References 

Towns in Sichuan
Wanyuan